Events in the year 1970 in the People's Republic of China.

Incumbents 
 Chairman of the Chinese Communist Party – Mao Zedong
 President of the People's Republic of China – vacant
 Premier of the People's Republic of China – Zhou Enlai
 Chairman of the National People's Congress – Zhu De
 Vice President of the People's Republic of China – Soong Ching-ling and Dong Biwu
 Vice Premier of the People's Republic of China – Lin Biao

Governors  
 Governor of Anhui Province – Li Desheng
 Governor of Fujian Province – Han Xianchu
 Governor of Gansu Province – Song Ping 
 Governor of Guangdong Province – Liu Xingyuan
 Governor of Guizhou Province – Ma Li 
 Governor of Hebei Province – Li Zaihe  
 Governor of Heilongjiang Province – Pan Fusheng 
 Governor of Henan Province – Liu Jianxun   
 Governor of Hubei Province – Zeng Siyu
 Governor of Hunan Province – Li Yuan then Hua Guofeng  
 Governor of Jiangsu Province – Xu Shiyou 
 Governor of Jiangxi Province – Cheng Shiqing 
 Governor of Jilin Province – Wang Huaixiang 
 Governor of Liaoning Province – Chen Xilian 
 Governor of Qinghai Province – Liu Xianquan 
 Governor of Shaanxi Province – Li Ruishan 
 Governor of Shandong Province – Yang Dezhi
 Governor of Shanxi Province – Liu Geping 
 Governor of Sichuan Province – Zhang Guohua 
 Governor of Yunnan Province – Tan Furen (until October), Zhou Xing (starting October)
 Governor of Zhejiang Province – Nan Ping

Events

April
 April 24 - China launched its first space satellite Dong Fang Hong I as part of the PRC's Dong Fang Hong space satellite program.

October
 October 13 – The People's Republic of China and Canada signed established diplomatic relations.
 October 14 – A Chinese nuclear test is conducted in Lop Nor.

December
 December 30 – Construction of the Gezhouba Dam started.

Births
 September 7 – Gao Min, Chinese diver
 October 30 – Xie Jun, Chinese chess grandmaster

Deaths
 September 23 – Zhao Shuli, Chinese novelist and a leading figure of modern Chinese literature
 Li Tianyou
 Huang Qixiang

See also 
 1970 in Chinese film

References 

 
Years of the 20th century in China
China